Kancamagus (pronounced "cain-ka-MAW-gus",  "Fearless One", "Fearless Hunter of Animals"), was the third and final Sagamore of the Penacook Confederacy of Native American tribes. Nephew of Wonalancet and grandson of Passaconaway, Kancamagus ruled what is now southern New Hampshire. Wearied of fighting English settlers, as in the Raid on Dover, he made the decision in 1691 to move north into upper New Hampshire and what is now Quebec, Canada.

Kancamagus was also known as John Hogkins or John Hawkins.

References
Citations

Bibliography
 Dana Benner. Kancamagus led Pennacook uprisings against English encroachment. The Telegraph.  Sunday, July 11, 2010

Native American leaders
Abenaki people
17th-century Native Americans
Native American history of New Hampshire
First Nations history in Quebec